Trigonostomidae is a family of flatworms belonging to the order Rhabdocoela.

Genera

Genera:
 Archixenetes Ax, 1971
 Astrotorhynchus Graff, 1905
 Beklemischeviella Luther, 1943

References

Rhabdocoela